Taiz is a governorate of Yemen. The governorate's capital is Taiz, which is the third-largest city in Yemen. Today it is among the most important commercial centres in Yemen, owing to its proximity to rich farmland in the nation and to the important Red Sea port of Mocha. It also has an international airport, Taiz International Airport, with numerous services within Yemen and to neighbouring countries.

Geography
For such a small area, Taiz Governorate has an extraordinarily diverse geography. The western half of the governorate is part of the Tihamah coastal plain and has an exceedingly hot, humid and arid climate. The eastern half, however, is very mountainous, with the major peak being 3,070-metre-high Jabal Sabir, near Taiz city. These mountains trap the moisture created by an upper-level wind reversal between April and October, so that in the eastern half of the governorate annual rainfall increases from 200 millimetres (8 inches) in the foothills to probably more than 1,000 millimetres (40 inches) near Jebel Saber. Temperatures in the highlands remain high during the daytime, but at the highest elevations they can fall dramatically to -5 °C (23 °F) overnight.

Mountain ranges 
The governorate has many mountains. Their height ranges between 1,000 and 3,200 metres. The most important mountains are Jabal Sabir, Jabal Habashi, Jabal Samaʿa, Jabal Qadas, Jabal As-Silw, the mountains of al-Wazi'iyah and the Mountains of Shar'ab and Maqbanah.

Streams 
There are many streams in Taiz governorate; known as wadi, they are divided into perennial and temporary streams:

Perennial streams 
Wadi Rasian, it is located in Mawza, Shara'b Ar Rawnah, al-Makha and Maqbanah.
Wadi Warzan, it is located in Khadir and al-Mawasit.
Wadi al-Dhabab, it is located in al-Mawasit and Hayfan.
Wadi Ar-Ram, it is located in al-Mafalis region, Hayfan.
Wadi al-Dhabab, it is located in Sabir al-Mawadim.
Wadi al-Ashroh also known as Wadi al-Barakani, is located in al-Mawasit.
Wadi al-Janah, is located in al-Wazi'iyah.
Wadi al-Lahya, is located in Mawza.

Temporary streams
Are the steams that only run in wet seasons:

Adjacent governorates
 Al Hudaydah Governorate (north)
 Ibb Governorate (north)
 Dhale Governorate (northeast)
 Lahij Governorate (southeast)

Districts

Taiz Governorate is divided into the following 23 districts. These districts are further divided into sub-districts, and then further subdivided into villages:

 Al Mukha District
 Al Ma'afer District
 Al Mawasit District
 Al Misrakh District
 Al Mudhaffar District
 Al Qahirah District
 Al Wazi'iyah District
 As Silw District
 Ash Shamayatayn District
 At Ta'iziyah District
 Dhubab District
 Dimnat Khadir District
 Hayfan District
 Jabal Habashy District
 Maqbanah District
 Mashra'a Wa Hadnan District
 Mawiyah District
 Mawza District
 Sabir Al Mawadim District
 Salh District
 Sama District
 Shara'b Ar Rawnah District
 Shara'b As Salam District

Economy
The agriculture of this governorate is diverse. In the Tihamah region, there is only irrigated agriculture, with cotton, sorghum and sesame the chief crops. Inland, whilst these crops are still significant, a much wider range of crops can be grown on rainfall and through water storage. Mangoes, papayas and bananas are the major crops of the western escarpment, and further up coffee and khat are grown. Although wine is prohibited in Yemen because of its alcohol content, grapes are still grown to produce raisins in some areas.

Wildlife 
The governorate has many wild animals and birds. The most common wild animals in the governorate are hyaenas, foxes, tigers, lions, rock hyrax, african wild dog, rabbits, hedgehog, monkeys. The most common wild birds are vultures, falcons, partridges, owls, pigeons, hoopoes, bulbuls.

Regions

Shamir:  also called "Shamir Maqbanah". It is a mountainous region part of Maqbanah district.
Al-Hugariyyah: It is the largest region in Taiz governorate. It is sometimes mistakenly called al-Hujariah district. The region is part of As-Silw, al-Ma'afer, Hayfan, Sama', al-Mawasit, Jabal Habashy, Dimnat Khadir, and al-Wazi'iyah districts.

Islands
Perim
Jazirat Ziadi

References

External links

Official site of the taiz governate

 
Governorates of Yemen